Nina Violić (born 15 March 1972) is a Croatian actress. Violić graduated from the Zagreb Academy of Dramatic Art in 1994. She has appeared in more than twenty films since 1993. She also hosted the Croatian version of the quiz show The Weakest Link in 2004.

Selected filmography

References

External links
 

1972 births
Living people
Actors from Rijeka
Croatian film actresses
Croatian television actresses
Golden Arena winners
Croatian Theatre Award winners